A glazier is a tradesman responsible for cutting, installing, and removing glass (and materials used as substitutes for glass, such as some plastics). They also refer to blueprints to figure out the size, shape, and location of the glass in the building. They may have to consider the type and size of scaffolding they need to stand on to fit and install the glass. Glaziers may work with glass in various surfaces and settings, such as cutting and installing windows, doors, shower doors, skylights, storefronts, display cases, mirrors, facades, interior walls, ceilings, and tabletops.

Duties and tools

The Occupational Outlook Handbook of the U.S. Department of Labor lists the following as typical tasks for a glazier:

Follow blueprints or specifications
Remove any old or broken glass before installing replacement glass
Cut glass to the specified size and shape
Make or install sashes or moldings for glass installation
Fasten glass into sashes or frames with clips, moldings, or other types of fasteners
Add weather seal or putty around pane edges to seal joints.

The National Occupational Analysis recognized by the Canadian Council of Directors of Apprenticeship separates the trade into 5 blocks of skills, each with a list of skills, and a list of tasks and subtasks a journeyman is expected to be able to accomplish:

 Block A – Occupational Skills

 Block B – Commercial Window and Door Systems

 Block C – Residential Window and Door Systems

 Block D – Specialty Glass and Products

 Block E – Servicing

Tools used by glaziers "include cutting boards, glass-cutting blades, straightedges, glazing knives, saws, drills, grinders, putty,scrapers, sandpaper, sanding blocks, 5 in 1's respirator/dust mask and glazing compounds."

Some glaziers work specifically with glass in motor vehicles; other work specifically with the safety glass used in aircraft. Others repair old antique windows and doors that need glass replaced.

Education and training
Glaziers are typically educated at the high school diploma or equivalent level and learn the skills of the trade through an apprenticeship program, which in the U.S. is typically four years.

In the U.S., apprenticeship programs are offered through the National Glass Association as well as trade associations and local contractors' associations. A large portion of glaziers in the United States are members of the IUPAT, the International Union of Painters and Allied Trades which offers its own apprenticeship program which consists of 8000 hours of on the job training and 4 years of classroom education. Because of this, IUPAT Glaziers tend to be well rounded in all aspects of the trade, and therefore carry a higher production rate, face fewer health & safety risks and command a higher pay rate.

In Canada, glaziers usually go through a formal apprenticeship which includes about four years of on-the-job experience combined with classroom study in order to get certified. Unions and many employers offer these apprenticeships. To become an apprentice, one must be at least 18 years old and have a graduated high school. Once a person is certified, they will be eligible to apply for the Red Seal  allowing the person to work anywhere in Canada without re-certifying.
In Ontario, Canada, apprenticeships are offered at the provincial level and certified through the Ontario College of Trades.

In Australia, while you do not need formal qualifications to work as a glazier, it is usual for apprentices to complete a Certificate III in Glass and Glazing as part of their training. Most apprentices choose to do the Certificate III in Glass and Glazing (MSF30418) part-time (three years). You can also choose to do the course full time (one year study). The Certificate II in Glass and Glazing (MSF20413) is also available for those who need additional study.

Occupational hazards
Occupational hazards encountered by glaziers include the risks of being cut by glass or tools and falling from scaffolds or ladders or lead exposure from old lead paint on  antique windows. The use of heavy equipment may also cause injury: the National Institute for Occupational Safety and Health (NIOSH) reported in 1990 that a journeyman glazier died in an industrial accident in Indiana after attempting to use a manlift to carry a thousand-pound case of glass which the manlift did not have capacity to carry.

In the United States
According to the Occupational Outlook Handbook, there are some 45,300 glaziers in the United States, with median pay of $38,410 per year in 2014. Two-thirds of Glaziers work in the foundation, structure, and building exterior contractors industry, with smaller numbers working in building material and supplies dealing, building finishing contracting, automotive repair and maintenance, and glass and glass product manufacturing.

Among the 50 states, only Connecticut and Florida require glaziers to hold a license.

See also 
 Architectural glass
 Glazing in architecture
 Insulated glazing
 Stained glass
 Glass manufacturing
 Glassblowing

Notes

External links

Construction trades workers
Glass engineering and science
Windows